The following is a list of Michigan State Historic Sites in Charlevoix County, Michigan. Sites marked with a dagger (†) are also listed on the National Register of Historic Places in Charlevoix County, Michigan.


Charlevoix County

See also
 National Register of Historic Places listings in Charlevoix County, Michigan

Sources
 Historic Sites Online – Charlevoix County. Michigan State Housing Developmental Authority. Accessed January 23, 2011.

References

Charlevoix County
State Historic Sites
Tourist attractions in Charlevoix County, Michigan